Seabaugh is a surname.

List of people with the surname 

 Alan Seabaugh (born 1967), American politician from Louisiana
 Mitch Seabaugh (born 1960), American politician from Georgia
 Todd Seabaugh (born 1961), American former football player
 Devan Seabaugh, American politician from Georgia

See also 

 Miller–Seabaugh House and Dr. Seabaugh Office Building
 Seabeck, Washington

Surnames
English-language surnames
Surnames of British Isles origin